Dalvik Turbo is a proprietary alternative to Google's implementation of the Dalvik virtual machine that runs on the Android operating system and other platforms developed by French/Swiss firm Myriad Group.

The virtual machine runs the Java platform on compatible mobile devices, and it can also run applications which have been converted into a compact Dalvik Executable (.dex) bytecode format for lower end devices.

MIPS TechnologiesImagination Technologies entered into a license agreement with Myriad to make their Dalvik Turbo Virtual Machine (VM) available to its licensees as part of its standard distribution of Android for its MIPS architecture.

Performance
Myriad claims applications run in Dalvik Turbo "up to three times" faster, while reducing battery drain and giving developers the power they need to create graphically intense games.

Dalvik Turbo has been shown on video to be 2.8 times faster while running a benchmark test.

References

External links
Myriad Alien Dalvik
MIPS Developers: What is Dalvik Turbo?

Register-based virtual machines
Java virtual machine
Android (operating system)